Eglantina Shabanaj (born 1979) is an Albanian chess player.

She earned the title of Woman Candidate Chess Master (WCM) in 2010.

Career
She won the women's section of the Albanian Chess Championship 14 times in the years 1994–1999, 2007, 2009, 2011, 2012, 2014, 2016, 2018 and 2019. 

She has played for the Albania Chess Team in 9 Olympiads in the years 1994, 2000, 2006, 2008, 2010, 2014, 2016, 2018, 2022. 

In the "2nd International Open Chess Tournament “Durrës 2014″ on 1-8th November 2014 in Durrës, Albania, WCM Eglantina Shabanaj (Albania) was ranked second female player of tournament.

References

1979 births
Living people
Albanian female chess players